Ketil Gjessing (born 18 February 1934) is a Norwegian poet. He made his literary début in 1962 with the collection Kransen om et møte. He was awarded the Gyldendal's Endowment in 1982.

References

 
 
 
 
 

1934 births
Living people
20th-century Norwegian poets
Norwegian male poets
20th-century Norwegian male writers